{{Infobox award
| name           = Filmfare Award for Best Actor
| awarded_for    = Best Performance by an Actor in a Leading Role in Malayalam Films
| image            = {{CSS image crop
| Image              = Shibu-ravindran.jpg
||bSize = 600
|cWidth = 205
|oLeft = 15
|oTop = 20
|cHeight = 280
| caption        = 2022 winner: Biju Menon for Ayyappanum Koshiyum
}}
| presenter      = Filmfare| country        = India
| year           = Madhu,Swayamvaram (1972)
| holder         = Biju Menon, Ayyappanum Koshiyum (2022)
| website        = 
}}

The Filmfare Award for Best Actor – Malayalam is an award instituted in 1972, presently annually at the Filmfare Awards South to an actor via a jury. This given by the Filmfare magazine as part of its annual Filmfare Awards South for performers in Malayalam cinema. The award was first given in 1972. The 2022 winner of the award is Biju Menon. As of 2021, Mammootty leads the list with 12 wins.

Superlatives

Mohanlal holds the record for most consecutive wins, having won the award for three years in a row from 1993 to 1995. Five other actors have won the award in consecutive years; in chronological order, they are Madhu (1976–77), Pratap Pothen (1979–80), Bharat Gopi (1982–83), Mammootty (1984–85), Mammootty (1998–99), and Mammootty (1990–91), Mammootty (2009–10), Fahadh Faasil (2012–13) and Mammootty (2014–15).
Only one actor has won the Best Actor award for their debut performance: Premji for Piravi (1989)
Kamal Haasan became the youngest Best Actor winner in the history of the award at the age of 20 for Kanyakumari (1974). Mohanlal became the second youngest winner of the Best Actor award at the age of 26 for Sanmanassullavarkku Samadhanam (1986).
Kamal Haasan and Madhu achieved supremacy in the 1970s with 2 wins, each. In the 1980s with 2 wins Bharat Gopi, Mammootty and Mohanlal reigned. Mammootty and Mohanlal continued their domination in the 1990s with 3 wins each. Mammootty triumphed in the 2000s with 4 wins. Mammootty again led the 2010s with 3 wins to his credit.
Mammootty and Mohanlal holds a unique record of receiving nominations in this category in 4 decades (1980s, 1990s, 2000s and 2010s).
Mammootty holds the record of winning an award in 4 decades.
Premji and Mammootty are the only actors to win a Best Actor award for portraying a real person. Premji won in 1989 for portraying Professor Raghava Chakyar in Piravi and Mammootty in 1990 for portraying Vaikom Muhammad Basheer in Mathilukal'' (1990).

Multiple winners

 12 Wins: Mammootty
 8 Wins: Mohanlal
 3 Wins: Madhu, Jayaram, Fahad Fasil

Winners

References

External links 
 Filmfare Awards, indiatimes.com

Actors